Elliott Crayton McCants (September 2, 1865 – October 23, 1953), was an American author and educator from South Carolina.

McCants was born outside Ninety Six, South Carolina in 1865, and graduated from The Citadel in 1886.

McCants published his first short story in the New York Evening Post in 1898, and subsequently published many stories in other popular magazines of the day, as well as writing a column for local newspapers.  His writings also include the Reconstruction Era novel In the Red Hills (1904), One of the Grayjackets and Other Stories (a short story collection) (1908), Histories, Stories, and Legends of South Carolina (1927), White Oak Farm (1928), and Ninety Six (1930).  Much of his writing was set in South Carolina.

He retired from teaching in the late 1940s, having long served as the superintendent of schools for Anderson, South Carolina.

In 1996, he was inducted into the South Carolina Academy of Authors.

References

External links
 Inventory of the Elliott Crayton McCants Papers, 1886-1950, Duke University Libraries
 In the Red Hills (1904) (full scan via Google books)
 One of the Grayjackets (1908)(full scan via Google books)
 History, Stories, and Legends of South Carolina (1927) (full scan via Hathi Trust)
 White Oak Farm (1928) (full scan via Hathi Trust)

1865 births
1953 deaths
The Citadel, The Military College of South Carolina alumni
Writers from South Carolina
People from Ninety Six, South Carolina
20th-century American short story writers